Christopher John Mullin (born 12 December 1947) is a British journalist, author and Labour politician.

As a journalist in the 1980s, Chris Mullin led a campaign that resulted in the release of the Birmingham Six, victims of a miscarriage of justice. In March 2022, a court case settled that Mullin would not need to release any notes relating to who may have planted the two bombs. Mullin is the author of four novels, including A Very British Coup (1982), which was later adapted for television, and its sequel The Friends of Harry Perkins. Mullin is also a celebrated diarist.

Mullin was the Member of Parliament (MP) for Sunderland South from 1987 until 2010. In Parliament, he served as Chairman of the Home Affairs Select Committee and as a Minister in the Department for Environment, Transport and the Regions, the Foreign and Commonwealth Office and in the Department for International Development.

Early life

Mullin is the son of a Scottish Protestant father and an Irish Catholic mother, both of whom worked for Marconi. Mullin was educated at St Joseph's College, a Roman Catholic boarding independent school for boys (now co-educational) in the town of Ipswich in Suffolk, followed by the University of Hull, where he studied Law. He joined the Labour Party after his politics shifted leftward in response to the Vietnam War.

Journalist and activist

Before being elected as an MP, Mullin was a journalist, training with the Daily Mirror. In this period Mullin travelled to Russia and China. From there, his first main activity as a journalist came in the Vietnam War. He has been highly critical of the American strategy in Vietnam and has stated that he believes that the war, intended to stop the advance of Communism, instead only delayed the coming of market forces in the country. Mullin also reported from Cambodia in 1973 and 1980.

Birmingham Six

Mullin, working for the Granada current affairs programme World in Action, was pivotal in securing the release of the Birmingham Six, a long-standing miscarriage of justice. In 1985, the first of several World in Action programmes casting doubt on the men's convictions was broadcast. In 1986, Mullin's book, Error of Judgment: The Truth About the Birmingham Pub Bombings, set out a detailed case supporting the men's claims that they were innocent. It included his claim to have met some of those who were actually responsible for the bombings.

In March 1990, ITV broadcast the Granada Television documentary drama, Who Bombed Birmingham?, which re-enacted the bombings and subsequent key events in Mullin's campaign. Written by Rob Ritchie and directed by Mike Beckham, it featured John Hurt as Mullin, with Martin Shaw as World in Action producer Ian McBride, Ciaran Hinds as Richard McIlkenny, one of the Six, and Patrick Malahide as Michael Mansfield (QC). It was repackaged for export as The Investigation – Inside a Terrorist Bombing, and first shown on American television on 22 April 1990. Granada's BAFTA-nominated follow-up documentary after the release of the six men, World in Action Special: The Birmingham Six – Their Own Story, was telecast on 18 March 1991.

In 2019, Mullin was criticised by the relatives of some of the victims of the attack for not naming IRA bombing suspects who he met whilst investigating the case in the 1980s. Mullin was called "scum" and a "disgrace". Mullin has defended this decision on the grounds of journalistic ethics. He was quoted in The Guardian as having said: "In order to track down the bombers, I had to give assurances not only to guilty but to innocent intermediaries that I would not, during their lifetime, disclose the names of those who cooperated. Had I not done so, no one would have cooperated".

Bennism and Tribune
Mullin edited two collections of Tony Benn's speeches and writings, Arguments for Socialism (1979) and Arguments for Democracy (1981), and, as editor of the pro-Labour weekly Tribune from 1982 to 1984, provided effective support for Benn and his ideas. Mullin also sought to turn Tribune into a workers' cooperative, to its shareholders' chagrin.

Novelist
Mullin has published a total of four novels. His first novel was A Very British Coup, published in 1982, which portrays the destabilisation of a left-wing British government by the forces of the Establishment. He wrote it having discussed the idea of a left-wing Prime Minister being undermined by the establishment following the 1981 Labour Party Conference with Peter Hain, Stuart Holland and Tony Banks. Holland revealed in this discussion that he had written a number of chapters in a potential novel containing this story and that Hain had contacted publishers regarding the possibility of a similar novel. Subsequently Mullin was told by the former BBC correspondent Peter Hardiman Scott that he had been writing a book on this topic at the time.

The novel was adapted for television by Alan Plater, with substantial alterations to the plot, and screened in 1988. The screenwriter was Alan Plater and it was directed by Mick Jackson. Starring Ray McAnally, the series was first screened on Channel 4 and won Bafta and Emmy awards, and was syndicated to more than 30 countries. The book was also the basis for the 2012 four-part Channel 4 series, Secret State. Starring Gabriel Byrne, this version was written by Robert Jones. Mullin later wrote a sequel to A Very British Coup called The Friends of Harry Perkins which was published in 2019. The book explores Brexit and American–Chinese relations amongst other topics.

Mullin also published The Last Man Out of Saigon in 1986 about featuring a plot of a CIA agent sent into Vietnam in the last week of the war to set up a network of agents and also The Year of the Fire Monkey, a thriller about a CIA attempt to assassinate Chairman Mao using a Tibetan agent, in 1991.

Political career

Early political career
Mullin stood unsuccessfully in the 1970 general election against Liberal Leader Jeremy Thorpe in North Devon. Mullin also fought Kingston-upon-Thames in February 1974.

By 1980, he was an executive member of the Labour Co-ordinating Committee. Mullin was also on the executive of the influential Campaign for Labour Party Democracy. As such he was an active supporter of Tony Benn when, in 1981, disregarding an appeal from party leader Michael Foot to abstain from inflaming the party's divisions, Benn stood against the incumbent Deputy Leader of the Labour Party, Denis Healey. In addition Mullin edited two collections of Benn's speeches and writings Arguments for Socialism (1979) and Arguments for Democracy (1981). He was widely regarded as a leading 'Bennite', a highly influential movement within the Labour Party in the early 1980s.

Parliament
Mullin was first elected MP for Sunderland South in 1987, and was returned at every subsequent election up to and including 2005. His constituency was the first to declare in every general election between 1992 and his standing down in 2010 (1992, 1997, 2001 and 2005). Mullin joked about being the UK's sole MP for a few minutes and muses about forming a government. He did not seek re-election in 2010. Mullin was on the left of the party and his selection for Sunderland South (occasioned by the retirement of Gordon Bagier MP) met with the disapproval of Neil Kinnock, at the time the Leader of the Labour Party. In the late 1980s, the right-wing, tabloid press targeted Mullin for his left-wing views frequently. Headlines included: "20 things you didn't know about crackpot Chris", "Loony Lefty MP", and "Is this the most odious man in Britain?"

Having reported from Cambodia in 1973 and 1980, in 1990 he was outspoken on the British Government's record in Cambodia, being a leading voice in some of the first protracted debates on Britain's provision of military support to the Khmer Rouge and attributing increasing public interest in the issue to the documentary films of John Pilger.

He was a member of the Socialist Campaign Group, Secretary of the All-Party Parliamentary Group for Vietnam, a member of the All-Party Group on Tibet and Chair of the All-Party Parliamentary Group for Cambodia, Member of the Home Affairs Select committee (1992–97), and Chairman of the Home Affairs Select Committee from 1997 to 1999 and again from 2001 to 2003.

In government
Despite occasional criticism of the government, he replaced Alan Meale as Parliamentary Under-Secretary of State at the Department of the Environment, Transport, and the Regions in July 1999 before taking over from George Foulkes as Parliamentary Under-Secretary, Department for International Development in 2001.

Despite having voted against the Iraq war, he returned to government in June 2003, as a Parliamentary Under-Secretary at the Foreign and Commonwealth Office in charge of Africa, but after the 2005 election again returned to the backbenches. Before the Labour victory of 1997, Mullin had attained a reputation for campaigning on behalf of victims of injustice and opposition to the curtailing of civil rights. His campaigning stance had to change while a minister because of the collective responsibility of government. His vote against the government's proposal for 90 days' detention without trial for persons suspected of terrorism, as one of 49 Labour rebels, seemed to indicate a re-emergence of his civil libertarian instincts. Mullin criticised the Labour government's rotation of Ministers expressing his belief that the Blair Government changed Ministers too often and noted this in his final speech to the House of Commons.

After leaving government, Mullin also voted against the United Kingdom maintaining a nuclear deterrent.

Expenses claims
During the UK Parliamentary expenses scandal, Mullin, one of the lowest claimers, provided some comic relief when it was revealed that the television at his second home is a very old black-and-white model with a £45 TV licence.

Leaving parliament
On 10 May 2008, the Sunderland Echo site reported that Mullin had decided to stand down at the 2010 general election. This left Mullin having contested seven General Elections and having been elected in five of them.

Diaries

Mullin published three volumes of widely praised diaries that described the progress of "New Labour" from the death of the party leader John Smith in 1994 to the 2010 general election: A View from the Foothills (2009) (recounting Mullin's ministerial career from 1999–2005), Decline & Fall: Diaries 2005–2010 (2010) and A Walk-On Part: Diaries 1994–1999 (2011). Among other things, Mullin recorded his gradual disillusion with the Labour Party's left wing and his rather reluctant support, after Smith's death, for fellow North-Eastern MP Tony Blair (whom he dubbed "The Man") as the person most likely to lead the party back to power. He admired Blair as a leader and for his capacity to create a broad-based Labour Party. In spite of Iraq, Mullin remains an admirer of Blair, viewing him as a leader of exceptional ability. Peter Riddell of the Times suggested that A View From the Foothills deserved to become "the central text for understanding the Blair years", while Decline & Fall, in which Mullin (by then a backbencher again) expressed wry consternation at the way the government operated under Blair's successor Gordon Brown, were commended for their independence of outlook, revealing, as Jenni Russell put it in the Sunday Times, Mullin's "readiness to like people who don't echo his politics".

The three volumes were adapted for the stage by Michael Chaplin as A Walk on Part. It premiered at the Live Theatre in Newcastle-upon-Tyne in May 2011, before moving to the Soho Theatre in London. Mullin regularly gives talks on his diaries, politics and the rise and fall of New Labour.

Personal life
Mullin and his wife Ngoc live in Northumberland, and his hobbies include gardening.

In football he supported Sunderland A.F.C., and mentioned it in the May 1997 State Opening of Parliament speech.

Academic honours

On 28 January 2011, his alma mater, Hull University, awarded him an honorary Doctorate in Law, in recognition of his achievements. In December 2011, Newcastle University awarded Chris Mullin an honorary degree. Mullin now teaches a module at Newcastle University called 'The Rise and Fall of New Labour'. He was also awarded an honorary degree by the University of Essex in 2011. Mullin has also received honorary degrees from the University of Sunderland (2010) and City University London (1992).

Works

Novels
 A Very British Coup (1982)
 The Last Man Out of Saigon (1986)
 The Year of the Fire Monkey (1991)
 The Friends of Harry Perkins (2019)

Non-fiction
 Error of Judgment: The Truth about the Birmingham Bombings
 A View from the Foothills: The Diaries of Chris Mullin (2009)
 Decline & Fall: Diaries 2005–2010 (2010)
 A Walk-On Part: Diaries 1994–1999 (2011)
 Hinterland (2016)

As editor
 Tony Benn Arguments for Socialism (1979)
 Tony Benn Arguments for Democracy (1981)

References

External links 

Personal website
ePolitix: Chris Mullin
Guardian Unlimited Politics – Ask Aristotle: Chris Mullin MP
Chris Mullin MP on TheyWorkForYou.com
 

1947 births
Living people
People educated at St Joseph's College, Ipswich
Alumni of the University of Hull
20th-century British male writers
20th-century British novelists
British male journalists
British male novelists
British republicans
English socialists
English people of Irish descent
English people of Scottish descent
Labour Party (UK) MPs for English constituencies
People from Chelmsford
UK MPs 1987–1992
UK MPs 1992–1997
UK MPs 1997–2001
UK MPs 2001–2005
UK MPs 2005–2010